Runako Shakur Morton (22 July 1978 – 4 March 2012) was a Nevisian cricketer who played for West Indies in all formats of the game. He was a right-handed batsman and a right-handed offbreak bowler.

Domestic career
A lively, often unpredictable character, Morton was expelled from the West Indian cricketing academy in July 2001 for bad behaviour but continued to play for the Leeward Islands in the Busta Cup.

International career
Upon his return in February 2002, he was called into the West Indies squad as a replacement for Marlon Samuels, but he was dropped once again when he lied about his non-appearance in the ICC Champions Trophy in September 2002.

Following a stabbing incident in January 2004, he was arrested but was given a third chance in May 2005 when he was recalled for the South African Test.

He was involved in a bizarre run-out with Shivnarine Chanderpaul in the third Test against New Zealand in 2006. Morton drove the ball to mid-on where Daniel Vettori was fielding and ran to the non-striker end. Chanderpaul, at the other end, initially took a few steps down the wicket but then turned and went back to the non-striker's end. Morton believed he was out, and, furious at his captain, began to walk off. However, following a call to the third umpire, it was decided that Morton had grounded his bat at the non-striker's end just before Chanderpaul, and hence was safe and that Chanderpaul was out. Video evidence suggests that the umpire's decision was wrong: although Morton made his ground first, he then left it before the run-out was made, so he should have been the one dismissed.

As a batsman, Morton had a reputation for hitting the ball very hard, but had problems picking up singles in between boundaries. He has the dubious record of the slowest ODI duck which lasted 31 balls in the final of the DLF Cup against Australia.

Morton died on 4 March 2012, when he lost control of the car he was driving along the Sir Solomon Hochoy Highway, hitting a utility pole at Chase Village in Chaguanas, Trinidad and Tobago.

References

1978 births
2012 deaths
Leeward Islands cricketers
West Indies One Day International cricketers
West Indies Test cricketers
West Indies Twenty20 International cricketers
West Indian cricketers of the 21st century
Road incident deaths in Trinidad and Tobago
Nevisian cricketers
Nevis representative cricketers
People from Saint George Gingerland Parish